Azhar Hussain (born 15 March 1984, Muzaffargarh) is a wrestler from Pakistan. In the 2010 Commonwealth Games, he won his country's first medal, a silver, and its second, a gold. His second medal, gave Pakistan a Commonwealth wrestling gold medal after 40 years. He is part of 42 Baloch regiment (MIB), Pakistan Army.

Background
Azhar Hussain belongs to Tehsil and District Muzaffargarh and is a resident of village near Modka.

Career

Pakistan Army
He joined Pakistan Army in year 2002 and was recruited in Baloch Regiment. During the initial days of his service, he competed in Unit/ Formation level wrestling competitions and displayed excellent competitive skills of wrestling.

Basing on his talent, he was selected to join Army Camp for further training under qualified Junior Commissioned Officer, Coach Subedar Hashim Ali.

Wrestling

2010

Hussain participated in the 55 kg class in both freestyle and Greco-Roman at the 2010 Commonwealth Games in New Delhi, India. He won a silver medal in Greco-Roman after he was defeated (11-0) by Rajender Kumar in the final. In the finals of the freestyle event he won the gold, defeating his Nigerian opponent and securing the country's first title since the 1970 Commonwealth Games in Edinburgh, where they won four golds.

2014
Hussain was selected to participate in the 2014 Commonwealth Games in Glasgow, UK In these Games, he won a bronze medal in the 57 kg freestyle wrestling event beating South Africa's B. Masunyane, 4–1.

References

1984 births
Pakistani male sport wrestlers
Commonwealth Games silver medallists for Pakistan
Commonwealth Games bronze medallists for Pakistan
Commonwealth Games gold medallists for Pakistan
Asian Games competitors for Pakistan
Living people
Wrestlers at the 2010 Commonwealth Games
Wrestlers at the 2014 Commonwealth Games
Wrestlers at the 2010 Asian Games
Commonwealth Games medallists in wrestling
People from Muzaffargarh
Medallists at the 2010 Commonwealth Games
Medallists at the 2014 Commonwealth Games